Western Uttar Pradesh is a region in India that comprises the western districts of Uttar Pradesh state, including the areas of Rohilkhand and those where Khariboli, Braj and Kannauji are spoken. The region has some demographic, economic and cultural patterns that are distinct from other parts of Uttar Pradesh, and more closely resemble those of Haryana and Rajasthan states. Western Uttar Pradesh has experienced rapid economic growth, in a fashion similar to Haryana and Punjab, due to the successes of the Green Revolution. A significant part of western Uttar Pradesh is a part of National Capital Region of India. The largest city of the region is Ghaziabad, while the second-largest city, Agra, is a major tourist destination.

Demographics

The population of Western Uttar Pradesh is composed of a varied set of communities and tribes, including Jats, Rajputs, Kayasthas, Tyagis, Ahirs, Brahmins, Kachhi, Kahar, Gadaria, Kumhar, Bania, Khatik, Lodha, Valmikis, Nai, Gurjars, Jatav, Kurmis and Rohilla Pashtuns. Brahmins, including Tyagis, constitute 17% of the population. Generally a myth is propagated that West UP has a Jat majority; in reality Jats are a small community in Western Uttar Pradesh outnumbered by other communities.

The unique setup of Western UP arises largely from the dominance of intermediate castes engaged in agriculture like the Brahmins with Tyagis, Jats (7%), Yadavs, Gurjars, Gadariyas  and Rajputs , the region in 1980s and 1990s was witness to the sugarcane mafia led by the above mentioned communities. Yadavs have very small presence in this region.

As per 2011 Census, the total population of Western Uttar Pradesh is 71,217,132, out of which 72.29% is Hindu and 26.21% is Muslim. The population in Khariboli region is 29,669,035, (Hindu 59.19% and Muslim 39.17%) and the population of Braj region is 29,754,755 (Hindu 82.78% and Muslim 16%). Muslim population share in eight districts of Saharanpur, Muzaffarnagar, Bijnor, Moradabad, Rampur, Jyotiba Phule Nagar, Meerut and Bareilly has increased from 29.93% in 1951 to 40.43% in 2011. This has been point of contention in politics with demands for population control bill being raised from Hindu groups.

The percentage of Muslims in Western Uttar Pradesh (~26%) is higher than the whole state of Uttar Pradesh(where it is 19.3%). Out of 77 assembly seats in this region, Muslim candidates won 26 seats in the 2012 assembly elections. Several communities are bi-religious.

The region's Rohillas are descended from immigrant groups from centuries ago, and a large subregion of Western Uttar Pradesh, Rohilkhand, takes its name from that Pashtun tribe.

Sikhs from West Punjab, who came from Pakistan after partition, also migrated to the area in large numbers.

Western Uttar Pradesh has gained notoriety for accounting for 30 per cent of the total honor killings in the country, according to a survey done by AIDWA.

Geography

Western Uttar Pradesh shares borders with the states of Uttarakhand, Himachal Pradesh, Haryana, Delhi, Rajasthan and Madhya Pradesh, as well as a brief international border with Nepal in Pilibhit district. Major cities and towns include Baghpat, Bareilly, Badaun, Agra, Mathura, Moradabad, Sambhal, Amroha, Ghaziabad, Noida, Bulandshahr, Meerut, Hapur, Saharanpur, Aligarh, Hathras, Kasganj, Muzaffarnagar, Rampur, Shahjahanpur, Etah, Firozabad, Mainpuri, Shamli, Bijnor, Najibabad, Farrukhabad, Etawah and Auraiya.

Soil conditions
Western Uttar Pradesh's soil and relief has marked differences from that of the eastern part of the state. The soil tends to be lighter-textured loam, with some occurrences of sandy soil. Some loess soil is continuously deposited by winds blowing eastwards from Rajasthan's Thar Desert.

Precipitation
Western Uttar Pradesh receives rain through the Indian Monsoon and the Western Disturbances. The Monsoon carries moisture northwards from the Indian Ocean, occurs in late summer and is important to the Kharif or autumn harvest. Western Disturbances, on the other hand, are an extratropical weather phenomenon that carry moisture eastwards from the Mediterranean Sea, the Caspian Sea and the Atlantic Ocean. They primarily occur during the winter season and are critically important for the main staple of the region, wheat, which is part of the Rabi or spring harvest.

Administrative divisions
Western Uttar Pradesh includes 30 districts in six divisions:
 Meerut division
 Saharanpur division
 Moradabad division
 Bareilly division
 Agra division
 Aligarh division
 Some districts of Kanpur Division

Districts : Meerut, Bulandshahr, Gautam Buddha Nagar, Ghaziabad, Hapur, Baghpat, Saharanpur, Muzaffarnagar, Shamli, Moradabad, Bijnor, Rampur, Amroha, Sambhal, Bareilly, Badaun, Pilibhit, Shahjahanpur, Agra, Firozabad, Mainpuri, Mathura, Aligarh, Etah, Hathras, Kasganj, Etawah, Auraiya and Farrukhabad.

Demands for statehood
In Uttar Pradesh, "the cultural divide between the east and the west is considerable, with the purabiyas (easterners) often being clubbed with Biharis." Also, while the green revolution resulted in a rapidly rising standard of living in Western Uttar Pradesh, Eastern Uttar Pradesh (like Bihar) did not benefit to the same extent. These cultural and economic disparities are believed to have fueled the demand for separate statehood in Western Uttar Pradesh. A separate entity would likely become a prosperous smaller state similar to Haryana and Punjab, under greater political control of local ethnic groups.

Some politicians and parties have demanded that Western Uttar Pradesh be granted statehood under the name Harit Pradesh. Braj Pradesh and Pashchim Pradesh are alternative names that have been proposed, because the region incorporates the historic region of Braj and is the western (pashchim in Hindi) part of Uttar Pradesh respectively.

Religious riots

Western Uttar Pradesh has a history of religious riots happening frequently. Many Hindu and Muslim riots happened in Meerut and Muzaffarnagar. Beginning on 27 August 2013, clashes between the Hindu and Muslim communities of the Muzaffarnagar district have claimed 43 lives and injured 93.

A girl from the Hindu Jat community was stalked by a Muslim youth in Kawal village. In retaliation, a Muslim youth named Shahnawaz Qureshi was killed by two brothers of the girl, Sachin Singh and Gaurav Singh. The two brothers were lynched by a Muslim mob when they were trying to escape.

Another major riot in Meerut took place on 22 May 1987, during the Hindu-Muslim riots in Meerut city in Uttar Pradesh state, India, when 19 personnel of the Provincial Armed Constabulary (PAC) allegedly rounded up 42 Muslim youth from the Hashimpura mohalla (locality) of the city, took them in truck to the outskirts, near Murad Nagar, in Ghaziabad district, where they were shot and their bodies were dumped in water canals. A few days later dead bodies were found floating in the canals. In May 2000, 16 of the 19 accused surrendered, and were later released on bail, while 3 were already dead. The trial of the case was transferred by the Supreme Court of India in 2002 from Ghaziabad to a Sessions Court at the Tis Hazari complex in Delhi, where it is the oldest pending case.

A Riot broke out in Kanth Village of Moradabad on 27 June 2014, over installation of loud speakers at a religious place, which was objected to by another community. The tension prevailed for over a week accompanied by frequent clashes. Another riot occurred between the Sikh and Muslim communities in Saharanpur over a land dispute, killing three and injuring many people. As much as 13 companies of the Rapid Action Force, the PAC and CRPF were conveyed by the government to take control of the situation after imposing curfew in riot-hit areas of Saharanpur.

Highway connectedness
Major highways running through the region include NH 2, NH 3, NH 11, NH 24, NH 58, NH 73, NH 74, NH 87, NH 91, NH 93, NH 119, NH 235, NH 709A, NH 709B, NH 709AD,

Noida Greater Noida Expressway

Yamuna Expressway

Agra Lucknow Expressway

Eastern Peripheral Expressway

Delhi-Meerut Expressway

Ganga Expressway.

Notable people

Politics and law

S. P. Singh Baghel
Ram Chandra Vikal
Sanjeev Balyan
Shafiqur Rahman Barq
Madan Bhaiya
Vedram Bhati
B. S. Chauhan
Choudhary Virender Singh
Jayant Chaudhary
Santosh Gangwar
Nand Kishor Gurjar
Azam Khan
Suresh Kumar Khanna
Satya Pal Malik
Imran Masood
Mayawati
Iqbal Mehmood
Rajesh Pilot
Surendra Singh Nagar
Malook Nagar
Vedram Bhati
Kadir Rana
Mahesh Sharma
Shrikant Sharma
Ajit Singh
Ch. Charan Singh
Chaudhary Laxmi Narayan Singh
Narain Singh
Prakash Vir Shastri
Hukum Singh
Kalyan Singh
Manish Sisodia
Mahavir Tyagi
Nitin Tyagi
Rajiv Tyagi
K. C. Tyagi
Satyavir Tyagi
Somendra Tomar
Ashok Katariya
Robert Vadra
Kumar Vishwas
Akhilesh Yadav
Akshay Yadav
D. P. Yadav
Dharmendra Yadav
Mulayam Singh Yadav
Ram Gopal Yadav
Shivpal Singh Yadav

Arts and Music
Rati Agnihotri
Vishal Bhardwaj
Bharat Bhushan
Mahima Chaudhry
Priyanka Chopra
Lara Dutta
Arun Govil
Boney Kapoor
Kailash Kher
Dushyant Kumar
Mandakini
Disha Patani
Naseeruddin Shah
Nawazuddin Siddiqui
Chitrangada Singh
Sushant Singh
Parag Tyagi
Roopal Tyagi
Sucharita Tyagi
Rajpal Yadav
Kumar Vishwas

Armed Forces
Rakesh Kumar Singh Bhadauria
Zameer Uddin Shah
Jas Ram Singh
Kushal Pal Singh
Asaram Tyagi
Shashindra Pal Tyagi
Yogendra Singh Yadav

Academics/Research

Shyam Swarup Agarwal
Javed Agrewala
Girjesh Govil
Anu Garg
Abhaya Indrayan
S. C. Jain
Shahid Jameel
Vinod Johri
Amitabh Joshi
Atma Ram
Anil Kumar Tyagi
Akhilesh Kumar Tyagi
Deep Tyagi
Yogesh Kumar Tyagi

Sports

Rahul Chaudhari
Dharampal Singh Gudha
Saurabh Chaudhary
Piyush Chawla
Kavita Devi
Bhuvneshwar Kumar
Praveen Kumar
Nishu Kumar
Satish Kumar
Seema Punia
Suresh Raina
Annu Rani
Sumit Rathi
Varun Singh Bhati
Parvinder Awana
Shahzar Rizvi
Saniya Shaikh
Chandro Tomar
Nitin Tomar
Prakashi Tomar
Harsh Tyagi
Kartik Tyagi
Sudeep Tyagi

References

Regions of Uttar Pradesh